Numi may refer to:

Places
 Ñumí, Paraguay; a district in the Guairá Department

People

Fictional characters
 Numi, a character in the U.S. TV series [[Patriot (TV series)|Patriot (TV series)]]
 ; a character from Japanese property Knights of Sidonia, see List of Knights of Sidonia characters

Food and drink
 Noomi'' herbal tea (also spelled as "numi" tea), a type of dried lime tea
 Numi Organic Tea, a tea brand and tea company

Other uses
 NuMI (Neutrinos at the Main Injector), a high energy physics experiment at Fermilab
 Ñumí Mixtec (Ñumí), a Mixtec language
 Neumi (also spelled as "Numi") a 1980 Korean film, also called "The Deaf Worker"

See also

 Numis, a financial institution located in the City of London ("the City")
 NUMIS (Northwestern University Multislice and Imaging System), see Multislice
 "Numi Numi", a 2004 artwork by Shuli Nachshon
 Numi-Torem, the supreme god of the Ob-Ugrian peoples
 
 
 Nummi (disambiguation)